Sholto Kairakau Black (13 January 1902–23 February 1963) was a New Zealand  teacher, principal, community services co-ordinator, community leader. Of Māori descent, he identified with the Te Whānau-ā-Apanui iwi. He was born in Ōpōtiki, Bay of Plenty, New Zealand on 13 January 1902.

References

1902 births
1963 deaths
New Zealand educators
Te Whānau-ā-Apanui people
New Zealand Māori schoolteachers
People from Ōpōtiki